Interstate 840 can refer to either of two highways in the United States:
 Interstate 840 (North Carolina), the northern half of the Greensboro Urban Loop around Greensboro, North Carolina
 Interstate 840 (Tennessee), the outer bypass of Nashville, Tennessee

40-8
8